Mees Hoedemakers (born 18 February 1998) is a Dutch professional footballer who plays as a midfielder for Eredivisie club Cambuur.

Club career
Hoedemakers made his Eerste Divisie debut for Jong AZ on 18 August 2017 in a game against FC Den Bosch.

He was sent to SC Cambuur on loan with option to purchase, in July 2019.

References

External links
 
 

Living people
1998 births
Footballers from Zaanstad
Association football midfielders
Dutch footballers
Netherlands youth international footballers
AZ Alkmaar players
SC Cambuur players
Eredivisie players
Eerste Divisie players
20th-century Dutch people
21st-century Dutch people